Mark David Quinn (born May 21, 1974) is an American former Major League Baseball outfielder and right-handed batter who played for the Kansas City Royals and former coach for the Baltimore Orioles. Quinn was drafted in the 11th round of the 1995 Amateur Draft after playing two seasons for the Rice University Owls.  He played for the Royals between 1999–2002. He retired for good in 2007 after spring training with the Yomiuri Giants.

Career
In 1998, Quinn led the Texas League in batting average when he hit .349 for the Wichita Wranglers.  He captured a second minor league batting crown the following year, posting a .360 average for the Omaha Golden Spikes of the Pacific Coast League.

On September 14, 1999 Quinn became just the third player in MLB history to hit two home runs in his major league debut, joining Bob Nieman (1951) and Bert Campaneris (1964). In  Quinn became the Royals regular leftfielder. He hit .294 with 20 home runs, earning him the Sporting News American League Rookie Player of the Year and a spot on the 2000 Topps All-Star Rookie Team. Quinn split the  season between right field, left field, and designated hitter.  His production at the plate dropped to 17 homers and a .269 average due to nagging hamstring injuries.

In four seasons with the Royals, Quinn batted .282 with 45 home runs, 167 RBI, 153 runs, 72 doubles, five triples, and 17 stolen bases in 293 games.

Quinn's 45 career home runs surpassed fellow Royals alumnus Jamie Quirk's total of 43, giving him the second-most home runs all time for a player whose last name begins with a "Q". Outfielder Carlos Quentin has 154 career home runs as of the end of the 2014 season.

Coaching
Mark Quinn owns The Baseball School in Houston, Tx, and coaches the Houston Royals select teams.

On January 6, 2016 Quinn was hired to become the assistant hitting coach for the Baltimore Orioles.

References

External links

Mark Quinn at Pura Pelota (Venezuelan Professional Baseball League)

1974 births
Living people
Baltimore Orioles coaches
Baseball players from California
Birmingham Barons players
Charlotte Knights players
Durham Bulls players
Kansas City Royals players
Lansing Lugnuts players
Long Beach Armada players
Major League Baseball hitting coaches
Major League Baseball left fielders
Memphis Redbirds players
Omaha Golden Spikes players
Omaha Royals players
Pastora de los Llanos players
American expatriate baseball players in Venezuela
Portland Beavers players
People from La Mirada, California
Rice Owls baseball players
Spokane Indians players
Wichita Wranglers players
Wilmington Blue Rocks players